Streptomonospora amylolytica is a species of bacterium. Its type strain is YIM 91353T (=DSM 45171T=CCTCC AA 208048T).

Description
It is halophilic, aerobic, catalase-positive, oxidase-negative and Gram-positive.

References

Further reading
Whitman, William B., et al., eds. Bergey's manual® of systematic bacteriology. Vol. 5. Springer, 2012.

External links
LPSN
Type strain of Streptomonospora amylolytica at BacDive -  the Bacterial Diversity Metadatabase

Actinomycetales
Bacteria described in 2009